Roderick Alexis P. Lindayag is a director for TV in the Philippines.

He is a brother of Rondel P. Lindayag, who also worked for ABS-CBN.

Filmography

TV director

References

External links
 

Filipino television directors
Living people
Year of birth missing (living people)